Edward Welsford Rowsell Howell (15 July 1902 – 20 August 1986),also known as pen name E.R. Howell, Edward Welsford Rowsell and Teddy/Ted Howell was a British Australian, character actor, radio and theatre producer, director and scriptwriter, theatre founder and drama teacher. 

He was notable for his career in Australia in all genres of the entertainment industry in a career spanning radio, stage, television and film. In 1927 he appeared in a cameo role in the early Australian film For the Term of his Natural Life, at the time the highest-grossing film in Australian cinema. After this film, he moved to radio broadcasting and producing until reviving his screen career in the late 1950s, mainly appearing in made for TV Movies and serials.

Early life

Howell was born on 15 July 1902 (some sources give 1901) in Bromley, Kent, England, the youngest son of bank clerk and actor Edwin Gilburt Howell and his wife Madeleine Ann (née Rowsell).
As an eight year old in 1912, he was brought to Australia with his brother, Lewis, and father to appear in J. C. Williamson's stage production of  The Blue Bird by Belgian playwright Maurice Maeterlinck After the family decided to stay in Australia permanently, he completed his education at Sydney Grammar. With his father moving to settle in Suva, young Ted soon followed, studying law while working in the government's legal department, before joining the Colonial Sugar Refining Co. Ltd.

Professional career

Theatre and tutoring

Whilst in Suva, Edward and father Edwin founded the Suva Dramatic Actor Guild. He returned to Australia in 1924 and joined the Playbox Theatre in Melbourne, and later, with his wife Molly, ran Sydney's (Royal) Academy of Dramatic Arts.

Radio and theatre (acting, producing, writing and directing)
In 1929, he began a career in radio when he was asked by the Australian Broadcasting Corporation (then Commission) to produce a play for the network. As an author of one of the first successful variety shows, he had a very prominent career in the sector as a writer, producer and director, as well as appearing in productions as an actor. He was best known as the creator and visionary behind the popular long-running serial Fred and Maggie Everybody, that ran under a number of titles between 1932 and 1953. The series depicted the life of a middle-class couple played by Edward and his wife, Mary Howell (professionally billed as Therese Desmond). At its height it was heard on fifty six stations throughout Australia and was sold to numerous countries including New Zealand.

Edward worked for Amalgamated Wireless (AWA), where he served as the chief producer of drama, before going freelance as producer and actor. In 1949, he returned to his native England and took up a post at the BBC, writing and producing radio productions as well as stage plays, and returned to Sydney in 1950, where he continued his radio and stage career as a prominent scriptwriter.

Television series, TV movies and film

After a lengthy successful career in radio and on stage he had a prominent career on television, starting from the 1960s appearing in numerous Australian serials, including My Name's McGooley, What's Yours?, Skippy the Bush Kangaroo, Homicide, Division 4 and Cop Shop. 

He appeared in the Brisbane TV play The Absence of Mr Sugden.

He was best known for his recurring role as Bert Griffiths in the long-running rural soap A Country Practice.

In film during the latter he appeared in The Cars That Ate Paris and Careful, He Might Hear You.

Personal life 

He was married to Mary Grace Cecilia Long (born Sheffield, 2 May 1902- died Sydney, New South Wales, Australia, 1961) on 11 May 1927, an English-born stage and radio actress and theatre director whom he also collaborated with and known professionally as Therese Desmond or Molly Long, whom he had met whilst appearing with Sydney's Playbox Theatre, marrying at the St. Mary's Cathedral in Sydney, Australia. Mary suffered a stroke in 1955 and died in 1961. Edward died on 20 August 1986, in a nursing home in Chatswood, New South Wales at the age of 84, and was cremated.

Theater founder

Theatre company

Drama school

Radio companies

Radio serial/s

Filmography

Television and film

References

External links
National Library of Australia collection of newspaper and journal cuttings about Teddy Howell. NLA reference number 42654244

Australian radio personalities
1902 births
Australian male television actors
Australian male film actors
Australian male radio actors
20th-century Australian male actors
1986 deaths
British emigrants to Australia